"This Land of Ours" is the local national song of the Turks and Caicos Islands, composed by Dr. Rev. Conrad Howell (12 December 1962 – 11 September 2015). As a British Overseas Territory, the official national anthem is "God Save the King".

Lyrics

References

Turks and Caicos Islands culture
North American anthems
1930 songs